Spariolenus is a genus of Asian huntsman spiders that was first described by Eugène Louis Simon in 1880.

Species
 it contains thirteen species, found in Asia:
Spariolenus aratta Moradmand & Jäger, 2011 – Iran
Spariolenus buxa (Saha, Biswas & Raychaudhuri, 1995) – India
Spariolenus fathpouri Moradmand, 2017 – Iran
Spariolenus hormozii Moradmand, 2017 – Iran
Spariolenus iranomaximus Moradmand & Jäger, 2011 – Iran
Spariolenus khoozestanus Zamani, 2016 – Iran
Spariolenus manesht Moradmand & Jäger, 2011 – Iran
Spariolenus mansourii Moradmand, 2017 – Iran
Spariolenus secundus Jäger, 2006 – Oman
Spariolenus taeniatus Thorell, 1890 – Indonesia (Sumatra)
Spariolenus taprobanicus (Walckenaer, 1837) – Sri Lanka
Spariolenus tigris Simon, 1880 (type) – India, Pakistan, Malaysia
Spariolenus zagros Moradmand & Jäger, 2011 – Iran

See also
 List of Sparassidae species

References

Araneomorphae genera
Sparassidae
Spiders of Asia